Olive Hockin (married name Olive Leared; 1881–1936) was a British suffragette, arsonist, author and artist.

Life
Between 1904 and 1911 she studied at the Slade. Her work was shown at the Royal Academy, by the Society of Women Artists and at the Walker Gallery. 

Hockin joined the suffragette movement in 1912. In 1913, after arson attacks on the Roehampton Golf Club and on a house at Walton Heath belonging to Lloyd George, suspected to be suffragette-related, Hockin was arrested, convicted and handed a four-month sentence. Her flat was said to contain stones, kerosene and false car number plates. Unusually she agreed not to go on hunger strike if she was allowed to paint. She was treated as a "Category One prisoner", and it was said by a fellow prisoner, Margaret Scott, that she carved the chair in her cell.

The National Portrait Gallery has a picture of her by the Criminal Record Office, and two pages of "Surveillance Photograph of Militant Suffragettes", also by the Criminal Record Office, which includes her. Her picture was taken from a concealed car in the prisoners' exercise yard using an 11 inch powerful lens which had been purchased by the Home Office. The secret pictures were required because the suffragettes would distort their faces when conventional mug shots were being taken. The Home Office was worried by the impact of their arson and vandal attacks and they were closing art galleries.

Hockin was a Land Girl during the Great War, and later wrote Two Girls on the Land: Wartime on a Dartmoor Farm, which was published in 1918. In 1922 she married John Leared who trained polo ponies in Cheltenham. They had two sons.

References

1881 births
1936 deaths
British suffragists
British women painters
People from Cheltenham
20th-century British painters
20th-century British women artists